is a Japanese baseball-themed manga series written and illustrated by Yuji Terajima. It was serialized in Kodansha's shōnen manga magazine Weekly Shōnen Magazine from May 2006 to January 2015, with its chapters collected in 47 tankōbon volumes. A sequel titled Ace of Diamond Act II was serialized from August 2015 to October 2022, with its chapters collected in 33 tankōbon volumes.

An anime television series adaptation ran from October 2013 to March 2016. An anime adaptation of Ace of Diamond Act II aired from April 2019 to March 2020.

As of August 2021, the manga had over 40 million copies in circulation, making it one of the best-selling manga series. In 2008, Ace of Diamond received the 53rd Shogakukan Manga Award for the shōnen category. In 2010, it won the 34th Kodansha Manga Award for best shōnen manga.

Plot

The series follows Eijun Sawamura, a baseball pitcher with an unusual pitching style that naturally causes the ball to move unpredictably at the plate. Sawamura plans to go with his friends to a local high school and play baseball to the best of their abilities. However, one scout from the prestigious Seido High School approaches him and offers him a scholarship and a chance to make it to the nationals. Sawamura decides to pay a visit to the school, and it changes his entire outlook on the future. Seido and their main rivals attempt to help the upperclassmen make it to nationals during the summer tournament. Once the summer tournament ends, the upperclassmen will be forced to retire, but Sawamura will help them to success, despite his lack of control. Some time later, Sawamura and his teammates, Furuya Satoru, Kominato Haruichi and Miyuki Kazuya, lead a new team, along with a few returning faces, through the fall tournament. Their overly ambitious goal is to go to nationals during the fall tournament and convince Coach Kataoka that he does not have to resign.

Ace of Diamond Act II continues to follow Sawamura and the team as they prepare to compete for the summer tournament. With a new year, new faces appear and join the Seido baseball club. Sawamura and Furuya compete with national level teams, being able to identify their own strengths and weaknesses and further mature their pitching style, all the while they are competing with each other to earn the coveted ace title. Simultaneously, the Seido batters are improving themselves to become as fearsome as the batting talent of their previous year's first-string team. With all of these preparations, Seido is aiming to win the summer tournament before the upperclassman have to graduate.

Media

Manga

Written and illustrated by Yuji Terajima, Ace of Diamond was serialized in Kodansha's Weekly Shōnen Magazine from 17 May 2006 to 14 January 2015. Kodansha collected the chapters into 47 tankōbon volumes, published from 15 September 2006 to 17 August 2015.

Kodansha USA has licensed the series for a digital release in English under the title Ace of the Diamond, and has been publishing the volumes since 7 March 2017. The series is licensed in Indonesia by Elex Media Komputindo.

A sequel manga, titled Ace of Diamond Act II was serialized in the same magazine from 19 August 2015 to 26 October 2022. Kodansha collected its chapters in 33 tankōbon volumes, released from 17 November 2015 to 17 February 2023.

A comedic spin-off, titled Daiya no B!, about the same characters, at the same school, but in a brass high school band, was published on Kodansha's Magazine Pocket web platform from 2015 to 2016. It was collected in three volumes, released from 17 November 2015 to 17 August 2016.

Another spin-off manga, titled Cat of Diamond, by Terajima's wife Yuki Okada, started on Magazine Pocket app and website on 12 January 2022.

Anime

The TV series was produced by Madhouse and Production I.G and began airing on 6 October 2013, on TX Network stations and later on AT-X. The episodes were simulcast in the US, Canada, UK, Ireland, Australia, New Zealand, South Africa, Denmark, Finland, Iceland, the Netherlands, Norway, Sweden, Central and South America, Spain, Brazil, and Portugal by Crunchyroll with English and German subtitles. The series was initially planned to be 52 episodes but was extended and ended in March 2015. A second season started airing soon after on 6 April 2015 on TX Network stations and later on AT-X. Like its predecessor the episodes were simulcast in the aforementioned countries by Crunchyroll with English and German subtitles. Two original animation DVDs were bundled with the fourth and fifth volumes of the Ace of Diamond Act II manga; the first was released on 15 July 2016 and the second was released on 16 September 2016.

An anime adaptation of Ace of Diamond Act II was announced in November 2018, and it premiered on 2 April 2019. The cast and staff reprised their roles from the previous series, with Madhouse returning for animation production. The series ran for 52 episodes.

Reception
Ace of Diamond received the 53rd Shogakukan Manga Award for the shōnen category in 2008. It also won the 34th Kodansha Manga Award for the shōnen category in 2010.

As of March 2015, the first 45 volumes of the series have sold over 22 million copies. As of November 2015, the manga had over 25 million copies in print. As of August 2021, the manga had over 40 million copies in print.

Ace of Diamond was the 25th best selling manga in 2011, with 1,711,607 copies sold. Nikkei Entertainment magazine published a list of top 50 manga creators by sales since January 2010, in its September 2011 issue; Yuji Terajima, the author of Ace of Diamond was ranked 20th, with 2,792,000 copies sold. It was the 27th best selling manga in 2012, with 1,685,194 copies sold. In 2013 Ace of Diamond became the 23rd best selling manga, with 2,010,045 copies sold.

Notes

References

External links
  
 Ace of Diamond official anime website 
 

2013 anime television series debuts
2019 anime television series debuts
Anime series based on manga
Baseball in anime and manga
Crunchyroll anime
Kodansha manga
Madhouse (company)
Manga adapted into television series
Production I.G
Shōnen manga
TV Tokyo original programming
Winner of Kodansha Manga Award (Shōnen)
Winners of the Shogakukan Manga Award for shōnen manga